All Saints Antiochian Orthodox Church is a Greek Orthodox church in Raleigh, North Carolina. The congregation is under the authority of the Antiochian Orthodox Christian Archdiocese of North America.

History 
The congregation of All Saints was established in 1991. In October 1992, All Saints was accepted as an Orthodox mission by the Antiochian Orthodox Christian Archdiocese of North America. Fr. Nicholas Sorensen was assigned as the first pastor of the mission, retiring in 2020. The congregation, later established as a parish, met in rented locations until the church purchased land on Buck Jones Road in Raleigh, completing construction on a church building in 1994. A new, larger church with domes was constructed in November 2010.

The congregation is under the Diocese of Miami and the Southeast. Although a Greek Orthodox congregation, the liturgy is said in English, not in Greek.

In January 2016, All Saints established a mission, St. Raphael Orthodox Mission Church, in Fuquay-Varina.

References 

Antiochian Orthodox Church in the United States
Church buildings with domes
Churches completed in 2010
Churches in Raleigh, North Carolina
Eastern Orthodox churches in North Carolina